Game engines are tools available for game designers to code and plan out a video game quickly and easily without building one from the ground up. Whether they are 2D or 3D based, they offer tools to aid in asset creation and placement.

Engines  
Note: The following list is not exhaustive. Also, it mixes game engines with rendering engines as well as API bindings without any distinctions.

See also 
 Physics engine
 Game engine recreation
 List of open-source video games
 List of WebGL frameworks
 Role-playing game creation software

References 

 
Technology-related lists